Telespazio VEGA are European aerospace companies and subsidiaries of Telespazio. 

 Telespazio Germany GmbH is a German aerospace company
 Telespazio VEGA UK is a British space company